Teymurlu or Teimoor Loo may refer to:
 Teymurlu, Azarshahr, East Azerbaijan Province
 Teymurlu, Osku, East Azerbaijan Province
 Teymurlu, Zanjan
 Teymurlu Rural District, in East Azerbaijan Province